Hermann (Ritter von) Lingg (22 January 1820 – 18 June 1905) was a German poet who also wrote plays and short stories. His cousin, Maximilian von Lingg, was Bishop of Augsburg.

He was born in Lindau. Lingg studied medicine at the universities of Munich, Freiburg, Berlin, and Prague, and became a doctor in the Bavarian Army. From 1839, he was a member of the Corps Suevia München. His battalion was used to quell revolutionary uprisings in Baden; forced to act against his convictions, he fell into severe depression, entered a mental hospital in 1851 and soon submitted his resignation. From that point on, he lived in Munich and devoted himself to historical and poetic studies, financially supported by King Maximilian II. His marriage to a forester's daughter in 1854 improved his mental stability, and a pension (with occasional financial support from friends, such as Max von Pettenkofer and Justus von Liebig, and the German Schiller Foundation) improved their living standards.

Lingg first gained attention with a collection of poems introduced by Emanuel Geibel (Stuttgart 1853). His most famous work is Die Völkerwanderung ("The Great Migration", Stuttgart, 1866–68, 3 vols). He was ennobled in 1890.

His poem "Immer leiser wird mein Schlummer" was set by Johannes Brahms as No. 2 of his Fünf Lieder, Op. 105 and  Max Bruch’s cantata Salamis is based on another of his poems. His manuscripts are now located in the Bavarian State Library. There are streets named after him in both Munich and Lindau.

Works 
 Catilina, 1864
 Die Walküren, 1865
 Vaterländische Balladen und Gesänge, 1868
 Liebesblüten aus Deutschlands Dichterhain, lyrical collection, 1869
 Gedichte, 3rd book, 1870
 Zeitgedichte, 1870
 Wanderungen durch die internationale Kunstausstellung in München, 1870
 Violante, tragedy, 1871
 Dunkle Gewalten, epic poetry, 1872
 Die Besiegung der Cholera, play, 1873
 Der Doge Candiano, 1873
 Berthold Schwarz, 1874
 Die Sizilianische Vesper, 1876
 Macalda, tragedy, 1877
 Schlusssteine, poems, 1878
 Byzantinische Novellen, stories, 1881
 Von Wald und See, stories, 1883
 Clytia. Eine Szene aus Pompeji, 1883
 Skaldenklänge, collection of ballads by contemporary poets (with Gräfin Ballestrem), 1883
 Högnis letzte Heerfahrt. Nordische Szene, 1884
 Lyrisches, poems, 1885
 Die Bregenzer Klause, 1887
 Meine Lebensreise, autobiography, 1899

Bibliography 
 Emil Pfaff: Hermann Lingg als epischer Dichter. Ebering, Berlin 1925.
 Frieda Port: Hermann Lingg. Eine Lebensgeschichte. Beck, München 1912.
 Walter Knote: Hermann Lingg und seine lyrische Dichtung. Mayr, Würzburg 1936.
 Arnulf Sonntag: Hermann Lingg als Lyriker. Lindauer, München 1908.
 Manfred Zschiesche: Hermann Lingg. Eine Erscheing des deutschen Spätklassizismus. Mit besonderer Berücksichtigung seiner Dramen. Korn, Breslau 1940.

References

External links
 

 
 
 Transkriptionen bei ngiyaw eBooks - sowie Digitalisate bei ngiyaw Sources
 "Über moderne Lyrik" von Hermann Lingg im Projekt "Lyriktheorie"
 Paul Heyse: Autobiographisches, Jugenderinnerungen und Bekenntnisse, 5. König Max und das alte München, Das Krokodil

1820 births
1905 deaths
German poets
Burials at the Alter Nordfriedhof (Munich)
German male poets
19th-century poets
German-language poets
19th-century German writers
19th-century German male writers